Robert Levy (1888–1959) was an English-born theatre manager and film producer whose  support for African-American actors helped pave the way for the recognition of race films.

Early life
Levy was born to Jewish parents in London in 1888. In the late 19th century, the family immigrated to the United States where Levy was educated in the New York City public school system. In his early twenties, he found a job managing the American division of the Éclair Film Company, a leading French producer of film.

Management career
In 1916, the Lafayette Theater in Harlem, featuring a company of  Black vaudevillians and entertainers, was growing and in need of strong management. Robert Levy, who had entered the field of  Black entertainment with the Quality Amusement Company, was hired for this role. Charged with selecting plays, mounting shows and managing the travelling troupes as well as bookings at other theatres, Levy focused his efforts on turning the theatre into a site of quality productions. He produced all- Black cast versions of notable plays such as Madame X and Dr.Jekyll and Mr. Hyde, a breakthrough for  Black actors to perform in roles they were never offered before. His insistence on high production value and respectful treatment of  Blacks earned him initial acclaim from the public and press, but he nevertheless faced too many battles for his success to last long. Lester Walton, a popular  Black film critic and theatrical manager himself, criticised Levy for holding a position that he felt rightfully belonged to a  Black man. After producing more than 100 plays with all- Black casts, and under pressure from  Black newspaper sources, Levy left the theatre in 1919, determined to devote his efforts to  Black film, thereafter called race films.

Film career
As with his theatre productions, Levy wanted his films to be of the highest calibre, highlighting Blacks as serious actors with notable talent. In January 1921, he established Reol Films. Over the next few years he produced nine feature-length films and two documentaries. They featured Black actors such as Clarence Muse, Lawrence Chenault, Andrew S. Bishop, Sherman Dudley, Edna Morton, Inez Clough and Evelyn Preer and their involvement in these films often propelled them into larger careers.

Levy purchased the rights to The Sport of the Gods and The Uncalled, works by acclaimed  Black writer Paul Laurence Dunbar. In the early 1920s, race films were gaining prominence as a form of popular entertainment. The independent productions struggled to compete with the larger funding and distribution available to the big studios. By 1924 Levy faced the problem of finding distribution outlets for his films and closed his company.

In 2008, the U.S. Postal Service chose the promotional poster for The Sport of the Gods, Reol's first released film, to be featured on a postage stamp honouring  Black film.

Later life
Levy attempted to revive the Lafayette Players on the west coast after the demise of Reol Films but his theatrical efforts were unsuccessful. He returned to New York City in the early 1930s and accepted a job as a magazine editor. Levy, as editor, became a leading creator of detective magazines. His work in this area helped to establish the material for many film noir projects in the thirties and forties. He died in 1959, unrecognised by posterity for his pioneering role in Black theatre and film.

Theatrical productions with African American casts at Lafayette Theatre
The following is a list of all of the (all  Black) theatre productions that Levy was responsible for at the Lafayette Theatre between 1916 and 1919.

1888 births
American film producers
American Jews
1959 deaths
British emigrants to the United States
Film producers from London
Jewish film people
English Jews